Major General Sir William Louis Oberkirch Twiss,  (18 January 1879 – 13 October 1962) was a senior British Indian Army officer.

Biography
Born on 18 January 1879, William Twiss was educated at Bedford School and the Royal Military College, Sandhurst. He received his commission in January 1898, was appointed to the 25th Madras Infantry in March 1899 and then appointed to the 9th Gurkha Rifles in 1901. He served in China during the Boxer Rebellion between 1900 and 1901 as a Transport Officer and was mentioned in despatches and during the British expedition to Tibet, between 1903 and 1904.

Twiss served during the First World War in France and Flanders from September 1914 to September 1917 on the Staff and was deputy director of Military Intelligence, Army Headquarters, India, between 1917 and 1919. He commanded the 2/9th Gurkha Rifles, between 1921 and 1923, was Director of Military Intelligence, Army Headquarters, India, between 1923 and 1924, and Director of Military Operations, Army Headquarters, India, between 1924 and 1927.

Promoted to the rank of major general in 1929, Twiss commanded the Jullundur Brigade in 1930 and was Military Secretary, Army Headquarters, India, between 1932 and 1936, General Officer Commanding, Burma Independent District, between 1936 and 1937, and General Officer Commanding, Army in Burma, between 1937 and 1939.

Twiss was awarded the Military Cross in 1916, was appointed a Commander of the Order of the British Empire on 12 December 1919, a Companion of the Order of the Bath on 1 January 1930, and a Knight Commander of the Order of the Indian Empire on 14 June 1938. He retired from the British Indian Army in January 1939 and died on 13 October 1962.

References

1879 births
1962 deaths
People educated at Bedford School
Graduates of the Royal Military College, Sandhurst
British Indian Army generals
Recipients of the Military Cross
Companions of the Order of the Bath
Commanders of the Order of the British Empire
Knights Commander of the Order of the Indian Empire
Fellows of the Royal Geographical Society
Indian Army personnel of World War I
British people in colonial India